The 1984 Great Taste Coffee Makers season was the 10th season of the franchise in the Philippine Basketball Association (PBA).

Transactions

Awards
Ricardo Brown and Manny Victorino were named in the Mythical Five selection.
Manny Victorino was the season's Most Improved Player
Jeff Collins won the best import award in the Invitational Conference

Championships
The Great Taste Coffee Makers finally join the elite club of champion teams as they won their first-ever title in the 2nd All-Filipino Conference by scoring a 3-0 sweep over newcomer Beer Hausen.   The Gokongwei ballclub captured their second straight PBA championship by winning the Invitational Third Conference in a battle of champions as they defeated Crispa Redmanizers in the best-of-five title series, three games to two.

Won-loss records vs Opponents

Roster

References

Great Taste Coffee Makers seasons
Great